Daisy Khan is a Kashmiri-American Islamic campaigner, reformer, and executive director of the Women's Islamic Initiative in Spirituality and Equality (WISE), a women-led organization committed to peacebuilding, equality, and justice for Muslims around the world. Khan is a frequent media commentator on topics such as Muslim women's rights, Islam in America, Islamophobia, and violent extremism. In 2017, Khan published WISE Up: Knowledge Ends Extremism, a report intended to prevent the rise of hate and extremism and develop narratives of peace. Her memoir, Born with Wings, was published by Random House in April 2018. Khan has consistently been recognized for her work. She was listed among Time magazine's "100 Most Influential People", the Huffington Post included her in their "Top Ten Women Faith Leaders", and More magazine has described her as "a link between moderate Islam and the West."

Early life

Daisy Khan was born in the foothills of the Himalayas in the Indian state of Jammu and Kashmir. Khan was raised in a traditional, forward-thinking Muslim household, where education was highly valued.

Khan attended a Christian missionary school, St. Patrick's Presentation Convent School. In an environment with an plethora of Hindus, Sikhs, and Muslims; harmony, tolerance and unity were the primary mantra of her Kashmiri childhood.

Khan's grandfather, Ghulam Hassan Khan, was a powerful influence in her life. The chief engineer for the state of Kashmir, Khan studied civil engineering at Harvard in the 1920s and encouraged his children and grandchildren to pursue the best education available regardless of locale.

Transition to America
At the age of 16 with the support of her parents, Khan left for the United States to pursue an education in art and design. She arrived on Long Island, and lived in Jericho, New York, with an aunt and uncle.

After high school, she earned a degree from the New York School of Interior Design. In her early 20s, she moved to Manhattan and embraced the professional life, working 80-hour weeks as an architectural designer.

Throughout this period, Khan continued to wrestle with her religion. With the rise of the Iranian Revolution, she was forced to juxtapose the peaceful Islam of her childhood memories with the violent struggles portrayed by the media. Consequently, Khan found solace in Sufism.

Career

Career beginnings
In what Khan recalls as an odd coincidence, her first large projects involved religious architecture. Khan's first big project was helping to design the Islamic Center of Long Island, which was cofounded by her uncle and now one of the New York area's most prominent mosques. Khan later reached across religious lines and worked on designing a Hindu temple. Through her work with religious architecture and local devotees, Khan recognized how immigrants yearned to recreate their homelands in America.

Khan went on to work as project manager for what was then Shearson Lehman Brothers on the 106th floor of the World Trade Center. She remembers the lasting effect of the first foiled bombing in 1993. After Shearson she worked for the publishing company Primedia, where she oversaw the design of Seventeen magazine's offices, and then later joined a telecommunications firm.

Community service
In order to promote their vision of a harmonious and forward thinking Islam, Khan and her ex-husband, Imam Feisal Abdul Rauf, established the American Society for Muslim Advancement (ASMA) in 1997. Khan served as the executive director for the non-profit for 18 years. At ASMA, Khan dedicated herself to strengthening an expression of Islam based on cultural and religious harmony through interfaith collaboration, cultivating the next generation of leaders, promoting women's rights and building bridges through culture and arts.

Foundation of Women's Islamic Initiative in Spirituality and Equality
In an effort to emphasize commonalities among the Abrahamic traditions, Khan created groundbreaking interfaith theatrical productions including Same Difference and Cordoba Bread Fest.

To prioritize the advancement of Muslim women and the empowerment of youth globally, Khan launched two cutting edge programs to create a platform which maximized the collective impact of these social change agents. In 2004 Khan founded, Muslim Leaders of Tomorrow (MLT) in order to cultivate and empower a global network of young Muslim leaders. It is the largest network of young Muslim leaders around the globe.

In the early 2000s, Khan grew increasingly disturbed by the mistreatment (stonings, honor killings, forced marriages) of Muslim women around the world. In 2008, WISE launched the first global Muslim Women's Shura Council to provide religiously-grounded opinions on controversial issues that are relevant to Muslim women. Drawing upon its members' expertise in both Islamic jurisprudence and fields such as history, political science, theology and sociology, the Shura Council issued its first statement in 2009 titled "Jihad Against Violence", condemning violent extremism. The Global Muslim Women's Shura Council has made statements on domestic violence, violent extremism, female genital mutilation, and adoption. The Council's statements were used to train Imams in Afghanistan to champion women's rights and combat the spread of violent extremism.

In 2006 Khan founded, Women's Islamic Initiative in Spirituality and Equality (WISE). WISE operates in order to build a cohesive, global movement of Muslim women, promote women's rights, enable women to make dignified choices, and fully participate in creating just and flourishing societies.

Publications and activism
In 2017, Khan published WISE Up, a collaborative report written with the help of 72 contributors. WISE Up aims to counter the rise in hateful rhetoric and violent extremism. Amidst growing Islamophobia in the United States, Khan published an article in The Guardian titled, "Islamophobia is America's Greatest Enemy".

Khan also sat down for a panel discussion with the Council on Foreign Relations in June 2011 to discuss "Islam in America".

In March 2011, Khan spoke against Peter T. King's hearings on the "radicalization" of American Muslims. Khan further organized a rally against Peter T. King's hearings titled "I am a Muslim, Too" on March 6, 2011 in Times Square, NYC.

Khan also wrote a piece in the Huffington Post on civil liberties, titled, "Is the NYPD Really Against Muslims?"

In 2011, Khan brought together 300 people of all religions for a night of remembrance. The event, entitled In Good Faith: Stories of Hope and Resilience, highlighted hundreds of bridgebuilding projects undertaken since September 11, while also paying tribute to the Jewish, Christian, and Muslim families of 9/11 victims.

In 2009, Khan and her ex-husband proposed building a community center, the Cordoba House at Park51, two blocks from the World Trade Center, which precipitated a national dialogue in the US media about the right to worship and religious freedom.

Media

Khan regularly lectures in the United States and internationally. She has appeared on numerous media outlets, such as CNN, Al Jazeera, and BBC World's Doha Debates. She has served as an advisor and contributor to a variety of documentaries, including PBS's Muhammad: Legacy of a Prophet, National Geographic's Inside Mecca, and the Hallmark Channel's Listening to Islam. Khan is a contributor to the Washington Post "On Faith" blog and is frequently quoted in print publications, such as Time, Newsweek, Chicago Tribune, The New York Times, Frankfurter Allgemeine Zeitung, Saudi Gazette, and the Khaleej Times.

In 2006, Khan participated in a debate hosted by NPR's Intelligence Squared on "Weighing the Limits of Freedom of Expression", where her team argued against the notion that the "proposition of the freedom of expression includes the right to offend", and eventually lost by audience vote, to the opposition team led by Christopher Hitchens.

Awards and recognition
 Community Service Award, Bronx Community Council, 2017
 Service to Humanity Award, One Spirit Learning Alliance 2016
 Honoring Muslim Women in Our Community, Islamic Center of Long Island, 2015
 Faith in Action Award, International Center for Religion & Diplomacy, 2014
 Voices That Challenge Award, The Interfaith Alliance of NYS, 2013
 @DaisyKhan named one of the 140 Best Twitter Feeds of 2012
 First recipient of the Charles Ansbacher Award, Hunt Alternatives Fund, 2012
 Named one of the "10 Muslim Women Every Person Should Know", Huffington Post Religion Blog, 2012
 @DaisyKhan named in "7 Women You Must Follow on Twitter", Glamour, 2012
 Inspiring commitment to Inter-faith work. Common Ground, 2012
 Building Bridges Through Interfaith Dialogue, IQRA International Educational Foundation, 2011
 Eleanor Roosevelt Human Rights Award, Unitarian Service Committee, 2011
 The Edinburgh Peace Award - City of Edinburgh, Edinburgh Interfaith Association, Festival of Spirituality and Peace, and Conference of Edinburgh's Religious Leaders, 2011
 Prophetic Voice Award, The Shalom Center, 2011
 Commitment to Action, Clinton Global Initiative, 2010
 Women Who Empower and Inspire Award, The Arab American Family Support Center, 2010
 Daisy Khan named in 21 Leaders for the 21st Century: Seven Who Topple Tyrannies, Women's E-News, 2008
 Daisy Khan named a "Prime Mover", Hunt Alternatives Fund, 2007
 James Parks Morton Interfaith Award, The Interfaith Center of New York, 2006
 Lives of Commitment Award, Auburn Theological Seminary, 2005

References

External links
Biography  at the American Society for Muslim Advancement (ASMA)
Daisy Khan "On Faith" column archives at The Washington Post
Blog Entries at Huffington Post
Collected news and commentary at The New York Times

American Muslims
American Sufis
American activists
Living people
American columnists
People from Jericho, New York
Muslim reformers
Year of birth missing (living people)